Amy Dahl is a former women's basketball coach and former athletic director for sports at the University of Oklahoma. She served as the inaugural coach for the women's basketball team in 1974. She later worked as an administrative assistant at McGuire Bearing Company for 20 years, and has refereed volleyball for the past 27 years.

Head coaching record

Women's basketball

Softball

References

Oklahoma Sooners women's basketball coaches
Living people
American women's basketball coaches
Year of birth missing (living people)